KWFH is a radio station playing Christian Contemporary Music licensed to Parker, Arizona, broadcasting on 90.3 MHz FM. The station serves the areas of Lake Havasu City, Arizona, Needles, California, and Parker, Arizona. KWFH is owned by Advance Ministries, Inc.

References

External links
 KWFH's official website
 

WFH
Radio stations established in 1984
1984 establishments in Arizona